Mall of Egypt is the first shopping destination of its kind in Egypt. The mall is owned and managed by the Majid Al Futtaim Group, the leading pioneer in shopping malls, retail, and leisure across the Middle East and North Africa region. Mall of Egypt is located on Al Wahat Road in 6th of October. With a Gross Leasable Area (GLA) of 165,000 square meters, Mall of Egypt houses the best local and international retailers, including an unparalleled high-end fashion offering of the world’s most prestigious brands. Moreover, the mall will house major department stores as well as other fashion, lifestyle, sports, electronics, fine dining, and home furnishing outlets. With direct access to Wahat Road, the mall includes 6,500 car parking spaces. Mall of Egypt’s family leisure services include Ski Egypt – Africa’s first indoor skiing slope, a 21 multi-screen VOX Cinemas, and a Magic Planet family entertainment centre. The mall worth 6 billion EGP officially opened in March 2017.

References

 

Shopping malls in Egypt